Anton Tsirin (born 10 August 1987) is a Kazakh international footballer who plays as a goalkeeper for FC Irtysh Pavlodar.

Early and personal life
Tsirin was born in the Uzbek SSR, but moved to Pavlodar in Kazakhstan at the age of five.

Club career
In January 2012, Tsirin moved to FC Akzhayik before signing with FC Zhetysu in January 2013, and FC Atyrau at the start of the 2014 season. On 24 November 2014, Tsirin moved back to Irtysh.

International career
Tsirin made his international debut for Kazakhstan in 2011.

References

1987 births
Living people
Kazakhstani footballers
Kazakhstan international footballers
Kazakhstan Premier League players
FC Irtysh Pavlodar players
FC Akzhayik players
FC Zhetysu players
FC Atyrau players
FC Okzhetpes players
Association football goalkeepers
FC Kaisar players
FC Kyzylzhar players